Peter Daniel Truman (January 30, 1935 – February 13, 2018) was an American politician who was a Democratic member of the Pennsylvania House of Representatives.

References

1935 births
2018 deaths
Democratic Party members of the Pennsylvania House of Representatives
Politicians from Philadelphia